

le

leb-lep
lebrikizumab (USAN, INN)
leconotide (INN)
lecozotan (USAN, (INN))
ledazerol (INN)
ledercillin vk
ledismase (INN)
ledoxantrone (INN)
lefetamine (INN)
leflunomide (INN)
lefradafiban (INN)
leiopyrrole (INN)
lemalesomab (INN)
lemidosul (INN)
lemildipine (INN)
leminoprazole (INN)
lenalidomide'' (USAN)lenampicillin (INN)lenapenem (INN)lenefilcon A (USAN)lenercept (INN)leniquinsin (INN)lenograstim (INN)lenperone (INN)lentardlentelepirudin (INN)leptacline (INN)

ler-leulercanidipine (INN)lerdelimumab (INN)lergotrile (INN)leridistim (INN)lerisetron (INN)leritinelersivirine (USAN, INN)lescollesopitron (INN)lessinalestaurtinib (USAN)letimide (INN)letosteine (INN)letrazuril (INN)letrozole (INN)leuciglumer (INN)leucine (INN)leucinocaine (INN)leucocianidol (INN)leucovorin (Immunex Corporation)LeukArrestleukeran (GlaxoSmithKline)LeukoScanleuprorelin (INN)leurubicin (INN)leustatinleustatin (R.W. Johnson Pharmaceutical Research Institute)

lev
leva-levllevacetylmethadol (INN)levalbuterol propionate (USAN)levallorphan (INN)levamfetamine (INN)levamisole (INN)levamlodipine malate (USAN)levaquinlevatollevcromakalim (INN)levcycloserine (INN)levdobutamine (INN)levemopamil (INN)levetiracetam (INN)levisoprenaline (INN)levitralevlitelevlofexidine (INN)

levolevo-Dromoranlevo-Tlevob-levomlevobetaxolol (INN)levobunolol (INN)levocabastine (INN)levocarnitinelevocarnitine (INN)levocetirizine (INN)levodopa (INN)levodropropizine (INN)levofacetoperane (INN)levofenfluramine (INN)levofloxacin (INN)levofuraltadone (INN)levoglutamide (INN)levolansoprazole (INN)levoletlevomefolate calcium (USAN)levomefolic acid (USAN)levomenol (INN)levomepromazine (INN)levomequitazine (INN)levomethadone (INN)levomethorphan (INN)levometiomeprazine (INN)levomoprolol (INN)levomoramide (INN)

levon-levoxlevonantradol (INN)levonorgestrellevonorgestrel (INN)levophedlevophenacylmorphan (INN)levopromelevopropicillin (INN)levopropoxyphene (INN)levopropylhexedrine (INN)levoprotiline (INN)levoralevorin (INN)levormeloxifene (INN)levorphanol (INN)levosalbutamol (INN)levosemotiadil (INN)levosimendan (INN)levosulpiride (INN)levothyroxine sodium (INN)levotofisopam (USAN)levoxadrol (INN)levoxyllevulevulanlexlexacalcitol (INN)lexaprolexatumumab (INN)lexgenleucel-T (USAN)lexipafant (INN)lexithromycin (INN)lexivalexofenac (INN)lexxel'''